Dragan Damjanovic (born 1957 in Sarajevo, Bosnia and Hercegovina, Former Yugoslavia) is a Swiss-Bosnian-Herzegovinian materials scientist. From 2008 to 2022, he was a professor of material sciences at EPFL (École Polytechnique Fédérale de Lausanne) and head of the Group for Ferroelectrics and Functional Oxides.

Career 
Damjanovic received a Bachelor's degree (summa cum laude) in physics from the University of Sarajevo in 1980. He then joined L. Eric Cross at Pennsylvania State University for a Ph.D. In 1987, he graduated with a thesis in ceramics science titled: "Highly anisotropic electromechanical properties in modified lead titanate ceramics." The Philips Fellowship funded his research. He continued as a research associate at Pennsylvania State University's Materials Research Laboratory. He mainly worked on the pyroelectric properties of synthetic polypeptides, piezoelectric composites for underwater applications, and thermo-optical imagers. In 1991, he joined EPFL's Ceramics Laboratory at the Institute of Materials. Until 2022, he led the Group on Ferroelectrics and Functional Oxides as a professor at EPFL. He taught undergraduate and graduate courses on structure, defects, and electrical properties of materials

Research 
Damjanovic investigated physical processes at different driving fields over a wide range of spatial (atomic to macroscopic device size) and time (mHz to GHz) scales. He also studied how those processes affect the macroscopic behavior of ceramics, polymers, single crystals, and thin layers. His current research focuses on oxide perovskites, organometallic lead halide perovskites, and oxides with fluorite structures.

Distinctions 

Damjanovicis an IEEE Fellow, a Fellow of the American Ceramic Society, and since 2022 the President-elect of the IEEE Ultrasonics, Frequency Control and Ferroelectrics Society (UFFC-S). 

He is the recipient of the 2021 Humboldt Research Award, the 2020 Distinguished Service Award of the IEEE Ultrasonics, Ferroelectrics and Frequency Control Society, the 2018 IEEE Robert E. Newnham Ferroelectrics Award, the 2017 International Award of the Japanese conference on Ferroelectric Materials and Their Applications, the 2009 Rodolphe and René Haenny Award, and the 2009 Ferroelectrics Recognition Award of the IEEE UFFC-S.  He was distinguished lecturer for the IEEE UFFC-S in 2010/2011.

Selected works

References

External links 
 
 Website of the Group for Ferroelectrics and Functional Oxides

1957 births
Living people
University of Sarajevo alumni
Pennsylvania State University alumni
Academic staff of the École Polytechnique Fédérale de Lausanne
Scientists from Sarajevo
Bosnia and Herzegovina emigrants to Switzerland
21st-century Swiss physicists
20th-century Swiss physicists
Materials scientists and engineers
21st-century Bosnia and Herzegovina people
20th-century Bosnia and Herzegovina people
Fellow Members of the IEEE
Fellows of the American Ceramic Society